Five ships of the Royal Navy have borne the name HMS Exmouth, after Edward Pellew, 1st Viscount Exmouth:

  was a 90-gun screw propelled second-rate ship of the line launched in 1854. She was lent to the Metropolitan Asylums as a training ship in 1877 and was broken up in 1905.
  was a  launched in 1901, sold in 1920 and broken up in 1922.
  was the  training ship, launched in 1905. She was requisitioned as a depot ship from 1939 to 1945, and then returned to use as a training ship . She was broken up in 1978.
  was an E-class destroyer launched in 1934 and sunk by a U-boat in 1940.
  was a  launched in 1955 and broken up in 1979.

Royal Navy ship names